The San Francisco-based Bomb Hip-Hop Records has evolved since its humble beginnings in 1991 as a hip-hop publication to "one of the fifteen independent labels that matter" according to Rolling Stone. Bomb’s Return of the DJ series was ranked by Spin Magazine as #25 in their “The 90 Greatest Albums of the 90’s”. Having been credited with the revival of the D.J. as an artist in their own right for the Return of the DJ series, featured in the movie Scratch, the label is also known for spotlighting hip-hop from around the world. With a total of 77 releases to date (50 Full Length Albums, 5 EP's, 15 Singles, 4 Digital Albums, 2 Flexi Discs and one DVD), some of the artists that have appeared on releases from Bomb Hip-Hop include Dilated Peoples, Blackalicious, J-Live, Cut Chemist from Jurassic 5, Qbert, DJ Craze, Z-Trip, Rob Swift & Roc Raida from X-ecutioners, Noisy Stylus, Mr. Dibbs of Atmosphere, DJ Honda, DJ Format, Peanut Butter Wolf, Swollen Members, Defari, Paul Nice and AG of D.I.T.C., Jedi Mind Tricks, Mystik Journeymen, Kid Koala and Mixmaster Mike of the Beastie Boys.

The Magazine

The legendary Bomb magazine was created by Bay Area dj David Paul in 1991. The black & white 'zine focuses on all four elements (djing, mc[ing, graffiti, breakin') of the hip-hop culture on the local, national and international level. Some of the writers that wrote for the Bomb magazine during its existence (1991-1996) were Funken-Klein, Billy Jam, Spence Dookey, Cheo Coker, Jazzbo, Faisal Ahmed, Dave Tompkins, DJ Shadow, Kutmasta Kurt and many others who have all written or are currently writing for major publications or have moved on to other fields of the music industry. At that time there were very few other hip-hop publications and the large ones didn't really cover independent or new groups so the publication was well received by hip-hop fans throughout the world.
In 1992 The Bomb Hip-Hop Magazine issued two flexidiscs by Dan the Automator (of Dr. Octagon, Deltron, Gorillaz fame), Charizma and Peanut Butter Wolf and other artists. In 1994 Bomb Magazine released the first Bomb album titled "Bomb Hip Hop Compilation" that featured Blackalicious, Charizma and Peanut Butter Wolf, Mystic Journeymen, Madchild (Swollen Members), Q-bert as well as many others that the magazine had been in contact with by receiving and reviewing their demos. This was the birth of Bomb Hip Hop turning into a record label.

Discography

 Bomb Hip Hop Compilation - Various Artists (PGA 8888, 1994)
 Return of the DJ, Vol. 1 - Various Artists (BHH2002, 1995)
 Return of the DJ, Vol. 2 - Various Artists (BHH2003, 1997)

External links
- Official site

American record labels
Hip hop record labels